North Atlantic Convoy Raider is a wargame published by Microcomputer Games for TRS-80, Commodore PET, and Apple II in 1980. An Atari 8-bit family version was released in 1981.

Contents
North Atlantic Convoy Raider is a game where the player controls the Bismarck on its military maneuvers against British convoys and warships in the North Atlantic.

Reception
David Boyle reviewed North Atlantic Convoy Raider in The Space Gamer No. 35. Boyle commented that "The game overall is worthwhile for anyone who enjoys putting his wits against the computer, and doesn't mind a little luck playing a part."

Reviews
Moves #56, p26-27

References

External links
Review in 80 Micro
Review in The Addison Wesley Book Of Atari Software 1984
Review in Creative Computing

1980 video games
Apple II games
Atari 8-bit family games
Commodore PET games
Computer wargames
Naval video games
Ship simulation games
TRS-80 games
Video games developed in the United States